Thomas Ludindi Mwadeghu is a Kenyan politician. He belongs to the Orange Democratic Movement and was elected to represent the Wundanyi Constituency in the National Assembly of Kenya since the Kenyan parliamentary election in 2007.

References

Living people
Year of birth missing (living people)
Orange Democratic Movement politicians
Members of the National Assembly (Kenya)